Daylen Baldwin (born November 24, 1999) is an American football wide receiver for the Cleveland Browns of the National Football League (NFL). He played college football at Morgan State, Jackson State, and Michigan.

High school and recruiting
Baldwin played high school football at Farmington High School and Waterford Mott High School.

College football
Baldwin began his college football career at Morgan State. As a freshman in 2017, he appeared in 11 games and caught 16 passes for 181 receiving yards and one touchdown. As a sophomore, he appeared in 14 games and caught 14 passes for 152 receiving yards and one touchdown.

He transferred to Jackson State in 2019 and redshirted during the 2019 season. He appeared in six games for Jackson State during its spring 2021 season and led the Southwestern Athletic Conference with 27 receptions for 540 yards (90 yards per game) and seven touchdowns.

After a strong showing in the spring season, Baldwin was recruited as a graduate transfer by Ohio State, Penn State, and Michigan. He chose Michigan. 

In Michigan's season opener against Western Michigan, Baldwin had a 69-yard touchdown reception from J.J. McCarthy. He added a 56-yard touchdown reception against Wisconsin on October 2. On January 5, 2022, Baldwin declared for the 2022 NFL Draft.

Professional career
On August 3, 2022, Baldwin signed with the Cleveland Browns as an undrafted free agent. Baldwin was waived by the Browns on August 30, 2022. He was signed to the Browns' practice squad on August 31, 2022. He signed a reserve/future contract on January 9, 2023.

References

External links

 Morgan State Bears bio
 Jackson State Tigers bio
 Michigan Wolverines bio
 Cleveland Browns bio

1999 births
Living people
American football wide receivers
Cleveland Browns players
Jackson State Tigers football players
Michigan Wolverines football players
Morgan State Bears football players
People from Southfield, Michigan
Players of American football from Michigan